Acropolitis magnana is a species of moth of the family Tortricidae. It is found in Australia, where it has been recorded from New South Wales.

References

Archipini
Moths described in 1863
Moths of Australia
Taxa named by Francis Walker (entomologist)